The xenonium ion, XeH+, is an onium compound, consisting of protonated xenon.  Although the existence of the xenonium cation itself has not been proven, salts of the fluoroxenonium ion, XeF+, are known to exist, for instance fluoroxenonium pentafluoroplatinate (XeFPtF5), more commonly known as xenon hexafluoroplatinate.

References

Xenon compounds
Hypothetical chemical compounds
Hydrogen compounds
Cations